Aleksandr Savitsky (born March 20, 1971) is a retired male medley and breaststroke swimmer from Kazakhstan. He competed in three consecutive Summer Olympics, starting in 1992 (Barcelona, Spain) for the Unified Team. His best Olympic result was finishing in 15th place at the 1996 Summer Olympics in the Men's 4 × 100 m Medley Relay event.

External links
 
 sports-reference

1971 births
Living people
People from Temirtau
Kazakhstani male medley swimmers
Soviet male swimmers
Kazakhstani male breaststroke swimmers
Olympic swimmers of the Unified Team
Olympic swimmers of Kazakhstan
Swimmers at the 1992 Summer Olympics
Swimmers at the 1996 Summer Olympics
Swimmers at the 2000 Summer Olympics
Asian Games medalists in swimming
Asian Games bronze medalists for Kazakhstan
Swimmers at the 1994 Asian Games
Swimmers at the 1998 Asian Games
Medalists at the 1994 Asian Games
Medalists at the 1998 Asian Games
Kazakhstani people of Russian descent